Lambert Schuurs (born 15 October 1962) is a Dutch retired handball player and ultra-long distance runner. He is the Netherlands' record international player with 312 caps.

Career

Handball
Schuurs made his debut for the senior team of hometown handball club Sittardia in 1978 and played the majority of his career for them. After being demoted to the reserves team in 2000, he moved abroad to play for Neerpelt in Belgium and joined BFC a few months later.

He later became player/manager at Limburg Lions.

Running
In 2001, Schuurs finished 5th and best Dutch runner in the 50 kilometer Dead Sea Ultramarathon. He also became third in the Himalaya Run and finished earlier than renowned marathon runner Gerard Nijboer in the Jungfrau Marathon.

Personal life
Schuurs is married to Monique and they live in Nieuwstadt and have three children. 
His daughter Demi is a professional tennis player and his son Perr is a professional football player.

References

Dutch handball coaches
1962 births
Living people
People from Sittard
Dutch male handball players
Male ultramarathon runners
Limburg Lions players
Danish expatriate sportspeople in Belgium
Expatriate handball players
Knights of the Order of Orange-Nassau
Sportspeople from Limburg (Netherlands)